Matthew Glen McClure (born 17 November 1991) is a professional footballer who plays as a striker for National League South club Chippenham Town. Born in England, he has represented Northern Ireland at under-21 and under-19 level.

Club career
McClure started his career in the Wycombe Wanderers youth team and had spells at Burnham and Wealdstone on work experience deals during the 2009–10 season. He made his Wycombe first team debut as a late substitute against Shrewsbury Town on 25 September 2010. On 12 August 2011 McClure joined Hayes & Yeading on a month's loan. He scored nine minutes into his debut against Alfreton Town, but later suffered a dislocated ankle, leaving him out of action for several months. After returning from injury, McClure scored his first professional goal for Wycombe in a 4–1 defeat to Scunthorpe United on 3 March 2012.

On 20 November 2012, McClure scored two goals as Wycombe beat Rotherham United 3–2 at the New York Stadium. The following week he scored 2 more goals in a 3–0 home win against Burton Albion.

On 15 December 2012, McClure scored Wycombe's second goal in a 2–0 win over Accrington Stanley. Later in the match he was sent off for a second bookable offence.

On 3 March 2015, McClure came on as a substitute in the 68th minute in place of Sam Saunders in an eventual 2–1 away win at Tranmere Rovers, but was given a straight red card 70 seconds after coming on for elbowing Adam Dugdale. Later that year he was released by Wycombe.

On 16 July 2015, McClure signed for fellow League 2 side Dagenham & Redbridge.

In April 2019, he was released by Aldershot Town.

After a spell at Maidstone United McClure moved to Gloucester City in January 2020. Matt made his debut for City in a 2–1 loss away to Guiseley on 18 January 2020. During the remainder of the 2019–20 season, he made six more appearances, scoring two goals.

In January 2023, McClure joined Chippenham Town.

International career
McClure made his debut for the Northern Ireland under-19 team against Switzerland in April 2009. He received his first call-up to the Northern Ireland under-21 squad on 3 May 2012, for the European U21 Championship qualifier against Macedonia, and made his debut on 10 May 2012 as an 86th-minute substitute.

Career statistics

References

External links
Matt McClure player profile at wwfc.com

1991 births
Living people
Sportspeople from Slough
English footballers
English people of Northern Ireland descent
Association footballers from Northern Ireland
Northern Ireland under-21 international footballers
Association football forwards
Wycombe Wanderers F.C. players
Burnham F.C. players
Wealdstone F.C. players
Hayes & Yeading United F.C. players
Dagenham & Redbridge F.C. players
Aldershot Town F.C. players
Maidstone United F.C. players
Gloucester City A.F.C. players
Chippenham Town F.C. players
English Football League players
National League (English football) players
Isthmian League players
Southern Football League players
Footballers from Berkshire